Tweed is a rough, woollen fabric, of a soft, open, flexible texture, resembling cheviot or homespun, but more closely woven. It is usually woven with a plain weave, twill or herringbone structure. Colour effects in the yarn may be obtained by mixing dyed wool before it is spun.

Tweeds are an icon of traditional Scottish, Irish, Welsh and English clothing, being desirable for informal outerwear, due to the material being moisture-resistant and durable. Tweeds are made to withstand harsh climates and are commonly worn for outdoor activities such as shooting and hunting, in England, Wales, Ireland and Scotland. In Ireland, tweed manufacturing is now most associated with County Donegal but originally covered the whole country. In Scotland, tweed manufacturing is most associated with the Isle of Harris in the Hebrides.

Etymology

The original name of the cloth was tweel, Scots for twill, the material being woven in a twilled rather than a plain pattern. A traditional story has the name coming about almost by chance. Around 1831, a London merchant, James Locke, received a letter from a Hawick firm, Wm. Watson & Sons, Dangerfield Mills about some "tweels". The merchant misinterpreted the handwriting, understanding it to be a trade-name taken from the River Tweed that flows through the Scottish Borders textile area. The goods were subsequently advertised as Tweed and the name has remained since.

Traditions and culture

Traditionally used for upper-class country clothing such as shooting jackets, tweed became popular among the Edwardian middle classes who associated it with the leisurely pursuits of the elite. Due to their durability tweed Norfolk jackets and plus-fours were a popular choice for hunters, cyclists, golfers and early motorists, hence Kenneth Grahame's depiction of Mr. Toad in a Harris Tweed suit. Popular patterns include houndstooth, associated with 1960s fashion, windowpane, gamekeeper's tweed worn by academics, Glen plaid check, originally commissioned by Edward VII, and herringbone.

During the 2000s and 2010s, members of long-established British and American land-owning families started to wear high-quality heirloom tweed inherited from their grandparents, some of which pre-dated the Second World War.

In modern times, cyclists may wear tweed when they ride vintage bicycles on a Tweed Run. This practice has its roots in the British young fogey and hipster subcultures of the late 2000s and early 2010s, whose adherents appreciate both vintage tweed, and bicycles.

Musical instruments
Some vintage Danemann upright pianos have a tweed cloth backing to protect the internal mechanism. Occasionally, Scottish bagpipes were covered in tweed as an alternative to tartan wool.

The term "tweed" is used to describe coverings on instrument cables and vintage or retro guitar amplifiers, such as the Fender tweed and Fender Tweed Deluxe. Despite the common terminology, these coverings were cotton twill, and not actually tweed.

Types of tweed

 Harris Tweed: A handwoven tweed, defined in the Harris Tweed Act 1993 as cloth that is "Handwoven by the islanders at their homes in the Outer Hebrides, finished in the Outer Hebrides, and made from pure virgin wool dyed and spun in the Outer Hebrides".
 Donegal tweed: A handwoven tweed which has been manufactured for several centuries in County Donegal, Ireland, using wool from locally-bred sheep and dye from indigenous plants such as blackberries, gorse (whins), and moss.
 Silk tweed: A fabric made of raw silk with flecks of colour typical of woollen tweed.
 Saxony tweed: Originated in Saxony, Germany. It is a fabric made from the wool of merino sheep. It is very smooth and soft.

Gallery

See also
 1920s in fashion
 1950s fashion
 1960s fashion
 1970s fashion
 2000s in fashion
 2010s in fashion
 British Country Clothing
 Norfolk jacket
 Sports Jacket
 Woollen industry in Wales

Notes

References
 
 
 
 National Library of Scotland: SCOTTISH SCREEN ARCHIVE (archive films relating to tweed manufacture in Scotland)
 Anderson, Fiona (2016). Tweed. London: Bloomsbury Academic Press. .

External links 
 

Wool
Woven fabrics
Scottish clothing